Tetraacyldisaccharide 4'-kinase is an enzyme that phosphorylates the 4'-position of a tetraacyldisaccharide 1-phosphate precursor (DS-1-P) of lipopolysaccharide lipid A. This lipid forms outer membranes of Gram-negative bacteria. This enzyme catalyzes the chemical reaction

ATP + [2-N,3-O-bis(3-hydroxytetradecanoyl)-beta-D-glucosaminyl]-(1->6)-[2- N,3-O-bis(3-hydroxytetradecanoyl)-beta-D-glucosaminyl phosphate]  ADP + [2-N,3-O-bis(3-hydroxytetradecanoyl)-4-O-phosphono-beta-D- glucosaminyl]-(1->6)-[2-N,3-O-bis(3-hydroxytetradecanoyl)-beta-D- glucosaminyl phosphate]

This enzyme belongs to the family of transferases, specifically those transferring phosphorus-containing groups (phosphotransferases) with an alcohol group as acceptor.

References

 

EC 2.7.1
Enzymes of known structure